Lobatophasma (formerly Lobophasma) is a genus of insects in the family Mantophasmatidae. It is a monotypic genus consisting of the species Lobatophasma redelinghuysense, which is endemic to Western Cape Province, South Africa.

It is known from near Redelinghuys, Rawsonville, Cardouw, and Jonkiespoort in the Western Cape Province.

References

Mantophasmatidae
Monotypic insect genera
Insects of South Africa
Endemic fauna of South Africa